Euconosia xylinoides is a moth of the subfamily Arctiinae first described by Francis Walker in 1862. It is found on Borneo. The habitat consists of wet and dry heath forests.

References

Lithosiini
Moths described in 1862